Couptrain is a commune in the Mayenne department in north-western France.

See also
Communes of the Mayenne department
Parc naturel régional Normandie-Maine

References

Communes of Mayenne